Lutz Haueisen (born 12 October 1958) is a retired German amateur cyclist. He won two world titles in track events, in 1979 and 1981. His best achievement on the road was second place in the prologue of Tour de Pologne in 1986. His son Dennis (born 1978) is a professional road cyclist.

References

1958 births
Living people
Sportspeople from Jena
People from Bezirk Gera
German male cyclists
Cyclists from Thuringia
20th-century German people